Minnesota is a state in the Upper Midwestern region of the United States. It is the 12th largest U.S. state in area and the 22nd most populous, with over 5.75 million residents. Minnesota is home to western prairies, now given over to intensive agriculture; deciduous forests in the southeast, now partially cleared, farmed, and settled; and the less populated North Woods, used for mining, forestry, and recreation. Roughly a third of the state is covered in forests, and it is known as the "Land of 10,000 Lakes" for having over 14,000 bodies of fresh water covering at least ten acres. More than 60% of Minnesotans live in the Minneapolis–Saint Paul metropolitan area, known as the "Twin Cities", the state's main political, economic, and cultural hub. With a population of about 3.7 million, the Twin Cities is the 16th largest metropolitan area in the U.S. Other minor metropolitan and micropolitan statistical areas in the state include Duluth, Mankato, Moorhead, Rochester, and St. Cloud.

Minnesota, which gets its name from the Dakota language, has been inhabited by various indigenous peoples since the Woodland period of the 11th century BCE. Between roughly 200 and 500 CE, two areas of the indigenous Hopewell tradition emerged: the Laurel complex in the north, and Trempealeau Hopewell in the Mississippi River Valley in the south. The Upper Mississippian culture, consisting of the Oneota people and other Siouan speakers, emerged around 1000 CE and lasted through the arrival of Europeans in the 17th century. French explorers and missionaries were the earliest Europeans to enter the region, encountering the Dakota, Ojibwe, and various Anishinaabe tribes. Much of what is now Minnesota formed part of the vast French holding of Louisiana, which the United States purchased in 1803. After several territorial reorganizations, the Minnesota Territory was admitted to the Union as the 32nd state in 1858. Minnesota's official motto, is the only state motto in French; meaning "The Star of the North", it was adopted shortly after statehood and reflects both the state's early French explorers and its position as the northernmost state in the contiguous U.S.

As part of the American frontier, Minnesota attracted settlers and homesteaders from across the country, with its growth initially centered on timber, agriculture, and railroad construction. Into the early 20th century, European immigrants arrived in significant numbers, particularly from Scandinavia, Germany, and Central Europe; many were linked to the failed revolutions of 1848, which partly influenced the state's development as a center of labor and social activism. Minnesota's rapid industrialization and urbanization precipitated major social, economic, and political changes in the late 19th and early 20th centuries; the state was at the forefront of labor rights, women's suffrage, and political reform. Minnesota is considered Democratic-leaning, having voted for every Democratic presidential nominee since 1976, longer than any other U.S. state.

Since the late 20th century, the core of Minnesota's economy has diversified, shifting from traditional industries such as agriculture and resource extraction to services, finance, and health care; it is consequently one of the richest in terms of GDP and per capita income. The state is home to 11 federally recognized Native American reservations (seven Ojibwe, four Dakota), and remains a center of Scandinavian and German cultures with an influence of Lutheranism. In more recent decades, Minnesota has become more multicultural, driven by both larger domestic migration and immigration from Latin America, Asia, the Horn of Africa, and the Middle East; the state has the nation's largest population of Somali Americans and second largest Hmong population. Minnesota's standard of living and level of education are among the highest in the U.S., and it is ranked among the best states in metrics such as employment, median income, safety, and governance.

Etymology 

The word Minnesota comes from the Dakota name for the Minnesota River, which got its name from one of two words in Dakota: "", which means "clear blue water", or "", which means "cloudy water". Dakota people demonstrated the name to early settlers by dropping milk into water and calling it . Many places in the state have similar Dakota names, such as Minnehaha Falls ("curling water" or waterfall), Minneiska ("white water"), Minneota ("much water"), Minnetonka ("big water"), Minnetrista ("crooked water"), and Minneapolis, a hybrid word combining Dakota  ("water") and - (Greek for "city").

History 

When Europeans arrived in North America, the Dakota people lived in what is now Minnesota. The first Europeans to enter the region were French voyageurs, fur traders who arrived in the 17th century. They used the Grand Portage to access trapping and trading areas further into Minnesota. The Anishinaabe (also known as Ojibwe or Chippewa) were migrating into Minnesota, causing tensions with the Dakota people, and dislocated the Mdewakanton from their homelands along Mille Lacs Lake. Explorers such as Daniel Greysolon, Sieur du Lhut, Father Louis Hennepin, Jonathan Carver, Henry Schoolcraft, and Joseph Nicollet mapped the state.

The region was part of Spanish Louisiana from 1762 to 1802. The portion of the state east of the Mississippi River became part of the United States at the end of the American Revolutionary War, when the Second Treaty of Paris was signed. Land west of the Mississippi was acquired with the Louisiana Purchase, though the Hudson's Bay Company disputed the Red River Valley until the Treaty of 1818, when the border on the 49th parallel was agreed upon. In 1805 Zebulon Pike bargained with Native Americans to acquire land at the confluence of the Minnesota and Mississippi rivers to create a military reservation. The construction of Fort Snelling followed between 1819 and 1825. Its soldiers built a grist mill and a sawmill at Saint Anthony Falls, which were harbingers of the water-powered industries around which Minneapolis later grew. Meanwhile, squatters, government officials, and others had settled near the fort; in 1839 the army forced them off military lands, and most moved downriver, just outside the military reservation, to the area that became St. Paul.

Minnesota was part of several territorial organizations between acquisition and statehood. From 1812 to 1821 it was part of the Territory of Missouri that corresponded with much of the Louisiana Purchase. It was briefly an unorganized territory (1821–1834) and was later consolidated with Wisconsin, Iowa and half the Dakotas to form the short-lived Territory of Michigan (1834–1836). From 1836 to 1848 Minnesota and Iowa were part of the Territory of Wisconsin. From 1838 to 1846 Minnesota west of the Mississippi River was part of the Territory of Iowa. Minnesota east of the Mississippi was part of Wisconsin until 1848. When Iowa gained statehood western Minnesota was in an Unorganized Territory again. Minnesota Territory was formed on March 3, 1849. The first territorial legislature, held on September 2, 1849, was dominated by men of New England ancestry. Thousands of pioneers had come to create farms and cut timber. Minnesota became the 32nd U.S. state on May 11, 1858. The founding population was so overwhelmingly of New England origins that the state was dubbed "the New England of the West".

Treaties between the U.S. Government and the eastern Dakota and Ojibwe gradually forced the natives off their lands and onto reservations. As conditions deteriorated for the eastern Dakota, tensions rose, leading to the Dakota War of 1862. The conflict was ignited when four young Dakota men, searching for food, killed a family of white settlers on August 17. That night, a faction of Little Crow's eastern Dakota decided to try and drive all settlers out of the Minnesota River valley. In the weeks that followed, Dakota warriors killed hundreds of settlers, causing thousands to flee the area. The six-week war ended with the defeat of the eastern Dakota and 2,000 in custody, who were eventually exiled to the Crow Creek Reservation by the Great Sioux Reservation in Dakota Territory. The remaining 4,500 to 5,000 Dakota mostly fled the state into Rupert's Land. As many as 800 settlers were killed during the war.

Minnesota Governor Alexander Ramsey subsequently declared that "the Sioux Indians of Minnesota must be exterminated or driven forever beyond the borders of the state" and placed a bounty of $25/scalp on the heads of the eastern Dakota men. Over 1,600 eastern Dakota women, children, and elderly walked from the Lower Sioux Agency to Fort Snelling to be held until the spring thaw allowed riverboats to take them out of Minnesota to Crow Creek Indian Reservation. William Crooks, commander of 6th Minnesota, had a palisade erected around the encampment on Pike Island, just below the fort, to protect native people from the soldiers and settlers. Conditions there were poor and between 125 and 300 died of disease. Around 400 Dakota men were tried after the war. 303 were sentenced to death, but Abraham Lincoln reviewed the convictions and approved 39 of the death sentences. In December 1862, 38 of them were hanged.

In early 1863, Ramsey resigned as governor to become the Federal Indian Commissioner. His successor, Governor Henry Swift, raised the bounty to $200/scalp. A total of $325 was paid out to four people collecting bounties, including for Little Crow who was killed in July 1863. Upon becoming Indian Commissioner, Ramsey set out to get Ojibwe lands too. In 1863 he negotiated the Treaty of Old Crossing, whereby the Ojibwe ceded all their land in northern Minnesota and moved to reservations.

Logging, farming, and railroads were mainstays of Minnesota's early economy. The sawmills at Saint Anthony Falls and logging centers of Pine City, Marine on St. Croix, Stillwater, and Winona processed vast quantities of timber. These cities were on rivers that were ideal for transportation. St. Anthony Falls was later tapped to provide power for flour mills. Innovations by Minneapolis millers led to the production of Minnesota "patent" flour, which commanded almost double the price of "bakers'" or "clear" flour which it replaced. By 1900 Minnesota mills, led by Pillsbury, Northwestern, and the Washburn-Crosby Company (an ancestor of General Mills), were grinding 14.1% of the nation's grain.

The state's iron-mining industry was established with the discovery of iron in the Vermilion and Mesabi ranges in the 1880s, followed by the Cuyuna Range in the early 1900s. The ore went by rail to Duluth and Two Harbors for ship transport east via the Great Lakes.

Industrial development and the rise of manufacturing caused the population to shift gradually from rural areas to cities during the early 20th century. Nevertheless, farming remained prevalent. Minnesota's economy was hit hard by the Great Depression, resulting in lower prices for farmers, layoffs among iron miners, and labor unrest. Compounding the adversity, western Minnesota and the Dakotas were hit by drought from 1931 to 1935. New Deal programs provided some economic turnaround. The Civilian Conservation Corps and other programs around the state established some jobs for Indians on their reservations, and the Indian Reorganization Act of 1934 provided the tribes with a mechanism of self-government. This gave Natives a greater voice within the state and promoted more respect for tribal customs because religious ceremonies and native languages were no longer suppressed.

After World War II, industrial development quickened. New technology increased farm productivity through automation of feedlots for hogs and cattle, machine milking at dairy farms, and raising chickens in large buildings. Planting became more specialized, with hybridization of corn and wheat, and farm machinery such as tractors and combines became the norm. University of Minnesota professor Norman Borlaug contributed to these developments as part of the Green Revolution. Suburban development accelerated due to increased postwar housing demand and convenient transportation. Increased mobility in turn enabled more specialized jobs.

Minnesota became a center of technology after World War II. Engineering Research Associates was formed in 1946 to develop computers for the United States Navy. It later merged with Remington Rand, and then became Sperry Rand. William Norris left Sperry in 1957 to form Control Data Corporation (CDC). Cray Research was formed when Seymour Cray left CDC to form his own company. Medical device maker Medtronic also started business in the Twin Cities in 1949.

The United States Navy and Coast Guard have recognized Minnesota with:
  steam frigate

Geography 

Minnesota is the second northernmost U.S. state (after Alaska) and northernmost contiguous state, as the isolated Northwest Angle in Lake of the Woods County is the only part of the 48 contiguous states north of the 49th parallel. The state is part of the U.S. region known as the Upper Midwest and part of North America's Great Lakes region. It shares a Lake Superior water border with Michigan and a land and water border with Wisconsin to the east. Iowa is to the south, North Dakota and South Dakota are to the west, and the Canadian provinces of Ontario and Manitoba are to the north. With , or approximately 2.25% of the United States, Minnesota is the 12th-largest state.

Geology 

Minnesota has some of the earth's oldest rocks, gneisses that are about 3.6billion years old (80% as old as the planet). About 2.7billion years ago basaltic lava poured out of cracks in the floor of the primordial ocean; the remains of this volcanic rock formed the Canadian Shield in northeast Minnesota. The roots of these volcanic mountains and the action of Precambrian seas formed the Iron Range of northern Minnesota. Since a period of volcanism 1.1billion years ago, Minnesota's geological activity has been more subdued, with no volcanism or mountain formation, but with repeated incursions of the sea, which left behind multiple strata of sedimentary rock.

In more recent times, massive ice sheets at least one kilometer thick ravaged the state's landscape and sculpted its terrain. The Wisconsin glaciation left 12,000 years ago. These glaciers covered all of Minnesota except the far southeast, an area characterized by steep hills and streams that cut into the bedrock. This area is known as the Driftless Zone for its absence of glacial drift. Much of the remainder of the state has fifty feet (15m) or more of glacial till left behind as the last glaciers retreated. Gigantic Lake Agassiz formed in the northwest 13,000 years ago. Its flatbed now is the fertile Red River valley, and its outflow, glacial River Warren, carved the valley of the Minnesota River and the Upper Mississippi downstream from Fort Snelling. Minnesota is geologically quiet today; it experiences earthquakes infrequently, most of them minor.

Notwithstanding dramatic local differences in elevation, much of the state is a gently rolling peneplain.

Two major drainage divides meet in Minnesota's northeast in rural Hibbing, forming a triple watershed. Precipitation can follow the Mississippi River south to the Gulf of Mexico, the Saint Lawrence Seaway east to the Atlantic Ocean, or the Hudson Bay watershed to the Arctic Ocean.

It is joined by the Minnesota River at Fort Snelling, by the St. Croix River near Hastings, by the Chippewa River at Wabasha, and by many smaller streams. The Red River drains the northwest part of the state northward toward Canada's Hudson Bay. Approximately  of wetlands are within Minnesota's borders, the most of any state outside Alaska.

Flora and fauna 

Minnesota has four ecological provinces: prairie parkland, in the southwestern and western parts of the state; the eastern broadleaf forest (Big Woods) in the southeast, extending in a narrowing strip to the state's northwestern part, where it transitions into tallgrass aspen parkland; and the northern Laurentian mixed forest, a transitional forest between the northern boreal forest and the broadleaf forests to the south. These northern forests are a vast wilderness of pine and spruce trees mixed with patchy stands of birch and poplar.

Although logging continues, regrowth and replanting keep about a third of the state forested. Nearly all Minnesota's prairies and oak savannas have been fragmented by farming, grazing, logging, and suburban development.

While loss of habitat has affected native animals such as the pine marten, elk, woodland caribou, and bison, others like whitetail deer and bobcat thrive. Minnesota has the nation's largest population of timber wolves outside Alaska, and supports healthy populations of black bears, moose, and gophers. Located on the Mississippi Flyway, Minnesota hosts migratory waterfowl such as geese and ducks, and game birds such as grouse, pheasants, and turkeys. It is home to birds of prey, including the largest number of breeding pairs of bald eagles in the lower 48 states as of 2007, red-tailed hawks, and snowy owls. Hawk Ridge is one of the premier birdwatching sites in North America. The lakes teem with sport fish such as walleye, bass, muskellunge, and northern pike, while brook, brown, and rainbow trout populate streams in the southeast and northeast.

Climate 

Minnesota experiences temperature extremes characteristic of its continental climate, with cold winters and hot summers. Meteorological events include rain, snow, blizzards, thunderstorms, hail, derechos, tornadoes, and high-velocity straight-line winds.

Protected lands 

Minnesota's first state park, Itasca State Park, was established in 1891, and is the source of the Mississippi River. Today Minnesota has 72 state parks and recreation areas, 58 state forests covering about four million acres (16,000km2), and numerous state wildlife preserves, all managed by the Minnesota Department of Natural Resources. The Chippewa and Superior national forests comprise . The Superior National Forest in the northeast contains the Boundary Waters Canoe Area Wilderness, which encompasses over a million acres (4,000km2) and a thousand lakes. To its west is Voyageurs National Park. The Mississippi National River and Recreation Area (MNRRA) is a  corridor along the Mississippi River through the Minneapolis–St. Paul Metropolitan Area connecting a variety of sites of historic, cultural, and geologic interest.

Cities and towns 

Saint Paul, in east-central Minnesota along the banks of the Mississippi River, has been Minnesota's capital city since 1849, first as capital of the Territory of Minnesota, and then as the state capital since 1858.

Saint Paul is adjacent to Minnesota's most populous city, Minneapolis; they and their suburbs are collectively known as the Twin Cities metropolitan area, the country's 16th-largest metropolitan area and home to about 55% of the state's population. The remainder of the state is known as "Greater Minnesota" or "Outstate Minnesota".

The state has 17 cities with populations above 50,000 as of the 2010 census. In descending order of population, they are Minneapolis, Saint Paul, Rochester, Duluth, Bloomington, Brooklyn Park, Plymouth, Saint Cloud, Woodbury, Eagan, Maple Grove, Coon Rapids, Eden Prairie, Minnetonka, Burnsville, Apple Valley, Blaine, and Lakeville. Of these, only Rochester, Duluth, and Saint Cloud are outside the Twin Cities metropolitan area.

Minnesota's population continues to grow, primarily in the urban centers. The populations of metropolitan Sherburne and Scott counties doubled between 1980 and 2000, while 40 of the state's 87 counties lost residents over the same period.

The United States Navy has recognized
multiple Minnesota communities.

Demographics

Population 

From fewer than 6,120 white settlers in 1850, Minnesota's enumerated population grew to over 1.7million by 1900 and 3.4million by 1960. Growth then slowed, rising 11% to 3.8million in 1970, and an average of 9% over the next three decades to 4.9million in the 2000 census.

At the 2022 estimate Minnesota's population at 5,717,184 on July 1, 2022, a 0.19% increase since the 2020 United States census. The rate of population change, and age and gender distributions, approximate the national average. Minnesota's center of population is in Hennepin County.

At the 2010 census Minnesota's population was 5,303,925. The gender makeup of the state was 49.6% male and 50.4% female. 24.2% of the population was under age 18; 9.5% between 18 and 24; 26.3% from 25 to 44; 27.1% from 45 to 64; and 12.9% 65 or older.

According to HUD's 2022 Annual Homeless Assessment Report, there were an estimated 7,917 homeless people in Minnesota.

The table below shows the racial composition of Minnesota's population as of the 2020 census.

According to the 2017 American Community Survey, 5.1% of Minnesota's population were of Hispanic or Latino origin (of any race): Mexican (3.5%), Puerto Rican (0.2%), Cuban (0.1%), and other Hispanic or Latino origin (1.2%). The ancestry groups claimed by more than 5% of the population were German (33.8%), Norwegian (15.3%), Irish (10.5%), Swedish (8.1%), and English (5.4%). Minnesota was also a major destination for a wave of Finnish immigrants in the early 20th century, along with Wisconsin and Michigan. Among U.S. states, Minnesota has the highest number of Finnish-Americans, 100,545 as of 2019.

In 2011 non-Hispanic whites accounted for 72.3% of all births, but Minnesota's growing minority groups still form a smaller percentage of the population than in the nation as a whole.

Minnesota has the country's largest Somali population, with an estimated 57,000 people, the largest concentration outside of the Horn of Africa.

Religion 

The majority of Minnesotans are Protestants, including a large Lutheran contingent, owing to the state's largely Northern European ethnic makeup. Roman Catholics (of largely German, Irish, French and Slavic descent) make up the largest single Christian denomination. A 2010 survey by the Pew Forum on Religion and Public Life showed that 32% of Minnesotans were affiliated with Mainline Protestant traditions, 21% were Evangelical Protestants, 28% Roman Catholic, 1% each Jewish, Muslim, Buddhist, and Black Protestant, and smaller amounts of other faiths, with 13% unaffiliated. According to the Association of Religion Data Archives, the denominations with the most adherents in 2010 were the Roman Catholic Church with 1,150,367; the Evangelical Lutheran Church in America with 737,537; and the Lutheran Church–Missouri Synod with 182,439. This is broadly consistent with the results of the 2001 American Religious Identification Survey, which also gives detailed percentages for many individual denominations. The international Confessional Evangelical Lutheran Conference is headquartered in Mankato, Minnesota. Although Christianity is dominant, Minnesota has a long history with non-Christian faiths. Ashkenazi Jewish pioneers set up Saint Paul's first synagogue in 1856. Minnesota is home to more than 30 mosques, mostly in the Twin Cities metro area. The Temple of ECK, the spiritual home of Eckankar, is based in Minnesota.

Economy 

Once primarily a producer of raw materials, Minnesota's economy has transformed to emphasize finished products and services. Perhaps the most significant characteristic of the economy is its diversity; the relative outputs of its business sectors closely match the United States as a whole. Minnesota's economy had a gross domestic product of $383billion in 2019, with 33 of the United States' top 1,000 publicly traded companies by revenue headquartered in Minnesota, including Target, UnitedHealth Group, 3M, General Mills, U.S. Bancorp, Ameriprise, Hormel, Land O' Lakes, SuperValu, Best Buy, and Valspar. Private companies based in Minnesota include Cargill, the largest privately owned company in the United States, and Carlson Companies, the parent company of Radisson Hotels.

Minnesota's per capita personal income in 2019 was $58,834, the thirteenth-highest in the nation. Its 2019 median household income was $74,593, ranking thirteenth in the U.S. and fifth among the 36 states not on the Atlantic coast.

Industry and commerce 

Minnesota's earliest industries were fur trading and agriculture. Minneapolis grew around the flour mills powered by St. Anthony Falls. Although less than 1% of the population is now employed in the agricultural sector, it remains a major part of the state's economy, ranking sixth in the nation in the value of products sold. The state is the nation's largest producer of sugar beets, sweet corn, and peas for processing, and farm-raised turkeys. Minnesota is also a large producer of corn and soybeans, and has the most food cooperatives per capita in the United States. Forestry remains strong, including logging, pulpwood processing and paper production, and forest products manufacturing. Minnesota was famous for its soft-ore mines, which produced a significant portion of the world's iron ore for more than a century. Although the high-grade ore is now depleted, taconite mining continues, using processes developed locally to save the industry. In 2016 the state produced 60% of the country's usable iron ore. The mining boom created the port of Duluth, which continues to be important for shipping ore, coal, and agricultural products. The manufacturing sector now includes technology and biomedical firms, in addition to the older food processors and heavy industry. The nation's first indoor shopping mall was Edina's Southdale Center, and its largest is Bloomington's Mall of America.

Minnesota is one of 45 U.S. states with its own lottery; its games include multi-jurisdiction draws, in-house draws, and other games.

Energy use and production 

Minnesota produces ethanol fuel and is the first to mandate its use, a 10% mix (E10). In 2019 there were more than 411 service stations supplying E85 fuel, comprising 85% ethanol and 15% gasoline. A 2% biodiesel blend has been required in diesel fuel since 2005. Minnesota is ranked in the top ten for wind energy production. The state gets nearly one-fifth of all its electrical energy from wind.

Xcel Energy is the state's largest utility and is headquartered in the state; it is one of five investor-owned utilities. There are also a number of municipal utilities.

State taxes 

Minnesota has a progressive income tax structure; the four brackets of state income tax rates are 5.35%, 7.05%, 7.85%, and 9.85%. As of 2008 Minnesota was ranked 12th in the nation in per capita total state and local taxes. In 2008 Minnesotans paid 10.2% of their income in state and local taxes; the U.S. average was 9.7%. The state sales tax in Minnesota is 6.875%, but clothing, prescription drug medications and food items for home consumption are exempt. The state legislature may allow municipalities to institute local sales taxes and special local taxes, such as the 0.5% supplemental sales tax in Minneapolis. Excise taxes are levied on alcohol, tobacco, and motor fuel. The state imposes a use tax on items purchased elsewhere but used within Minnesota. Owners of real property in Minnesota pay property tax to their county, municipality, school district, and special taxing districts.

Culture

Fine and performing arts 

Minnesota's leading fine art museums include the Minneapolis Institute of Art, the Walker Art Center, the Frederick R. Weisman Art Museum, and The Museum of Russian Art (TMORA). All are in Minneapolis. The Minnesota Orchestra and the Saint Paul Chamber Orchestra are prominent full-time professional musical ensembles who perform concerts and offer educational programs to the Twin Cities' community. The world-renowned Guthrie Theater moved into a new Minneapolis facility in 2006, boasting three stages and overlooking the Mississippi River. Attendance at theatrical, musical, and comedy events in the area is strong. In the United States, Minneapolis's number of theater companies ranks behind only New York City's, and about 2.3million theater tickets were sold in the Twin Cities annually as of 2006. The Minnesota Fringe Festival in Minneapolis is an annual celebration of theatre, dance, improvisation, puppetry, kids' shows, visual art, and musicals with more than 800 performances over 11 days. It is the country's largest non-juried performing arts festival.

Literature 

The rigors and rewards of pioneer life on the prairie are the subject of Giants in the Earth by Ole Rolvaag and the Little House series of children's books by Laura Ingalls Wilder. Small-town life is portrayed grimly by Sinclair Lewis in the novel Main Street, and more gently and affectionately by Garrison Keillor in his tales of Lake Wobegon. St. Paul native F. Scott Fitzgerald writes of the social insecurities and aspirations of the young city in stories such as Winter Dreams and The Ice Palace (published in Flappers and Philosophers). Henry Wadsworth Longfellow's epic poem The Song of Hiawatha was inspired by Minnesota and names many of the state's places and bodies of water. Minnesota native Robert Zimmerman (Bob Dylan) won the 2016 Nobel Prize in Literature. Science fiction writer Marissa Lingen lives here.

Entertainment 

Minnesota musicians include Prince, Bob Dylan, Eddie Cochran, The Andrews Sisters, The Castaways, The Trashmen, Soul Asylum, David Ellefson, Chad Smith, John Wozniak, Hüsker Dü, Semisonic, The Replacements, Owl City, Holly Henry, Motion City Soundtrack, Atmosphere, and Dessa. Minnesotans helped shape the history of music through popular American culture: the Andrews Sisters' "Boogie Woogie Bugle Boy" was an iconic tune of World War II, while the Trashmen's "Surfin' Bird" and Bob Dylan epitomize two sides of the 1960s. In the 1980s, influential hit radio groups and musicians included Prince, The Original 7ven, Jimmy Jam & Terry Lewis, The Jets, Lipps Inc., and Information Society.

Minnesotans have also made significant contributions to comedy, theater, media, and film. The comic strip Peanuts was created by St. Paul native Charles M. Schulz. A Prairie Home Companion which first aired in 1974, became a long-running comedy radio show on National Public Radio. A cult sci-fi cable TV show, Mystery Science Theater 3000, was created by Joel Hodgson in Hopkins, and Minneapolis, MN. Another popular comedy staple developed in the 1990s, The Daily Show, was originated through Lizz Winstead and Madeleine Smithberg.

Joel and Ethan Coen, Terry Gilliam, Bill Pohlad, and Mike Todd contributed to the art of filmmaking as writers, directors, and producers. Notable actors from Minnesota include Loni Anderson, Richard Dean Anderson, James Arness, Jessica Biel, Rachael Leigh Cook, Julia Duffy, Mike Farrell, Judy Garland, Peter Graves, Josh Hartnett, Garrett Hedlund, Tippi Hedren, Jessica Lange, Kelly Lynch, E.G. Marshall, Laura Osnes, Melissa Peterman, Chris Pratt, Marion Ross, Jane Russell, Winona Ryder, Seann William Scott, Kevin Sorbo, Lea Thompson, Vince Vaughn, Jesse Ventura, and Steve Zahn.

Popular culture 

Stereotypical traits of Minnesotans include "Minnesota nice", Lutheranism, a strong sense of community and shared culture, and a distinctive brand of North Central American English sprinkled with Scandinavian expressions. Potlucks, usually with a variety of hotdishes, are popular small-town church activities. A small segment of the Scandinavian population attend a traditional lutefisk dinner to celebrate Christmas. Life in Minnesota has also been depicted or used as a backdrop, in movies such as Fargo, Grumpy Old Men, Grumpier Old Men, Juno, Drop Dead Gorgeous, Young Adult, A Serious Man, New in Town, Rio, The Mighty Ducks films, and in famous television series like Little House on the Prairie, The Mary Tyler Moore Show, The Golden Girls, Coach, The Rocky and Bullwinkle Show, How I Met Your Mother and Fargo. Major movies shot on location in Minnesota include That Was Then... This Is Now, Purple Rain, Airport, Beautiful Girls, North Country, Untamed Heart, Feeling Minnesota, Jingle All The Way, A Simple Plan, and The Mighty Ducks films.

The Minnesota State Fair, advertised as The Great Minnesota Get-Together, is an icon of state culture. In a state of 5.5million people, there were more than 1.8million visitors to the fair in 2014, setting a new attendance record. The fair covers the variety of Minnesota life, including fine art, science, agriculture, food preparation, 4-H displays, music, the midway, and corporate merchandising. It is known for its displays of seed art, butter sculptures of dairy princesses, the birthing barn, and the "fattest pig" competition. One can also find dozens of varieties of food on a stick, such as Pronto Pups, cheese curds, and deep-fried candy bars. On a smaller scale, many of these attractions are offered at numerous county fairs.

Other large annual festivals include the Saint Paul Winter Carnival, the Minnesota Renaissance Festival, Minneapolis' Aquatennial and Mill City Music Festival, Moondance Jam in Walker, Sonshine Christian music festival in Willmar, the Judy Garland Festival in Grand Rapids, the Eelpout Festival on Leech Lake, and the WE Fest in Detroit Lakes.

Health 

Minnesotans have low rates of premature death, infant mortality, cardiovascular disease, and occupational fatalities. They have long life expectancies, and high rates of health insurance and regular exercise. These and other measures have led two groups to rank Minnesota as the healthiest state in the nation; however, in one of these rankings, Minnesota descended from first to sixth in the nation between 2005 and 2009 because of low levels of public health funding and the prevalence of binge drinking. While overall health indicators are strong, Minnesota does have significant health disparities in minority populations.

On October 1, 2007, the Freedom to Breathe Act took effect, outlawing smoking in restaurants and bars in Minnesota.

The Minnesota Department of Health is the primary state health agency responsible for public policy and regulation. Medical care in the state is provided by a comprehensive network of hospitals and clinics operated by a number of large providers including Allina Hospitals & Clinics, CentraCare Health System, Essentia Health, HealthPartners, M Health Fairview and the Mayo Clinic Health System. There are two teaching hospitals and medical schools in Minnesota. The University of Minnesota Medical School is a high-rated teaching institution that has made a number of breakthroughs in treatment, and its research activities contribute significantly to the state's growing biotechnology industry. The Mayo Clinic, a world-renowned hospital based in Rochester, was founded by William Worrall Mayo, an immigrant from England.

U.S. News & World Report 2020–21 survey ranked 4,554 hospitals in the country in 12 specialized fields of care, and placed the Mayo Clinic in the top four in most fields. The hospital ranked first on the best hospitals honor roll. The only specialty where it fell outside the top ten was ophthalmology. The Mayo Clinic and the University of Minnesota are partners in the Minnesota Partnership for Biotechnology and Medical Genomics, a state-funded program that conducts research into cancer, Alzheimer's disease, heart health, obesity, and other areas.

Education 

One of the first acts of the Minnesota Legislature when it opened in 1858 was the creation of a normal school in Winona. Minnesota's commitment to education has contributed to a literate and well-educated populace. In 2009, according to the U.S. Census Bureau, Minnesota had the second-highest proportion of high school graduates, with 91.5% of people 25 and older holding a high school diploma, and the tenth-highest proportion of people with bachelor's degrees. In 2015, Minneapolis was named the nation's "Most Literate City", while St. Paul placed fourth, according to a major annual survey. In a 2013 study conducted by the National Center for Educational Statistics comparing the performance of eighth-grade students internationally in math and science, Minnesota ranked eighth in the world and third in the United States, behind Massachusetts and Vermont. In 2014, Minnesota students earned the tenth-highest average composite score in the nation on the ACT exam. In 2013, nationwide in per-student public education spending, Minnesota ranked 21st. While Minnesota has chosen not to implement school vouchers, it is home to the first charter school.

The state supports a network of public universities and colleges, including 37 institutions in the Minnesota State Colleges and Universities System, and five major campuses of the University of Minnesota system. It is also home to more than 20 private colleges and universities, six of which rank among the nation's top 100 liberal arts colleges, according to U.S. News & World Report.

Transportation 

Transportation in Minnesota is overseen by the Minnesota Department of Transportation (MnDOT) at the state level and by regional and local governments at the local level. Principal transportation corridors radiate from the Twin Cities metropolitan area and along interstate corridors in Greater Minnesota. The major Interstate highways are Interstate35 (I-35), I-90, and I-94, with I-35 and I-94 connecting the Minneapolis–St. Paul area, and I-90 traveling east–west along the southern edge of the state. In 2006, a constitutional amendment was passed that required sales and use taxes on motor vehicles to fund transportation, with at least 40% dedicated to public transit. There are nearly two dozen rail corridors in Minnesota, most of which go through Minneapolis–St. Paul or Duluth. There is water transportation along the Mississippi River system and from the ports of Lake Superior.

Minnesota's principal airport is Minneapolis–St. Paul International Airport (MSP), a major passenger and freight hub for Delta Air Lines and Sun Country Airlines. Most other domestic carriers serve the airport. Large commercial jet service is provided at Duluth and Rochester, with scheduled commuter service to four smaller cities via Delta Connection carriers SkyWest Airlines, Compass Airlines, and Endeavor Air.

Public transit services are available in the regional urban centers in Minnesota including Metro Transit in the Twin Cities, opt-out suburban operators Minnesota Valley Transit Authority, SouthWest Transit, Plymouth Metrolink, Maple Grove Transit and others. In Greater Minnesota transit services are provided by city systems such as Duluth Transit Authority, Mankato Transit System, MATBUS (Fargo-Moorhead), Rochester Public Transit, Saint Cloud Metro Bus, Winona Public Transit and others. Dial-a-Ride service is available for persons with disabilities in a majority of Minnesota Counties.

In addition to bus services, Amtrak's daily Empire Builder (Chicago–Seattle/Portland) train runs through Minnesota, calling at the Saint Paul Union Depot and five other stations. Intercity bus providers include Jefferson Lines, Greyhound, and Megabus. Local public transit is provided by bus networks in the larger cities and by two rail services. The Northstar Line commuter rail service runs from Big Lake to the Target Field station in downtown Minneapolis. From there, light rail runs to Saint Paul Union Depot on the Green Line, and to the MSP airport and the Mall of America via the Blue Line.

Law and government 

Minnesota is governed pursuant to the Minnesota Constitution, which was adopted on October 13, 1857, roughly one year before statehood. Like all U.S. states and the federal government, Minnesota has a republican system of political representation with power divided into three branches: executive, legislative, and judicial. The state constitution includes a bill of rights that reaffirms many of the same rights and freedoms as its federal counterpart, with some protected more strongly and explicitly.

Executive 

The executive branch is headed by the governor, currently Tim Walz, DFL (Democratic–Farmer–Labor), who took office on January 7, 2019. The governor has a cabinet consisting of the leaders of various state government agencies, called commissioners. The other elected constitutional offices are secretary of state, attorney general, and state auditor.

Constitutional officeholders:
 Governor Tim Walz (DFL)
 Lt. Governor Peggy Flanagan (DFL)
 Secretary of State Steve Simon (DFL)
 Attorney General Keith Ellison (DFL)
 State Auditor Julie Blaha (DFL)

Legislature 

The Minnesota Legislature is a bicameral body consisting of the Senate and the House of Representatives. The state has 67 districts, each with about 60,000 people. Each district has one senator and two representatives, each senatorial district being divided into A and B sections for members of the House. Senators serve for four years and representatives for two years.

Since 2023, both the House and Senate have had a slim DFL majority.

Judiciary 

Minnesota's court system has three levels. Most cases start in the district courts, which are courts of general jurisdiction. There are 279 district court judgeships in ten judicial districts. Appeals from the trial courts and challenges to certain governmental decisions are heard by the Minnesota Court of Appeals, consisting of 19 judges who typically sit in three-judge panels. The seven-justice Minnesota Supreme Court hears all appeals from the tax court, the workers' compensation court of appeals, first-degree murder convictions, and discretionary appeals from the court of appeals; it also has original jurisdiction over election disputes.

Two specialized courts within administrative agencies have been established: the workers' compensation court of appeals, and the tax court, which deals with non-criminal tax cases.

Supreme Court Justices
 Chief Justice Lorie Gildea
Associate Justices
 Barry Anderson
 David Lillehaug
 Natalie Hudson
 Margaret Chutich
 Anne McKeig
 Paul Thissen

Regional 

In addition to the city and county levels of government found in the United States, Minnesota has other entities that provide governmental oversight and planning. Regional development commissions (RDCs) provide technical assistance to local governments in the broad multi-county areas of the state. Along with this Metropolitan Planning Organizations (MPOs), such as the Metropolitan Council, provide planning and oversight of land use actions in metropolitan areas. Many lakes and rivers are overseen by watershed districts and soil and water conservation districts.

Federal 

Minnesota's United States senators are Democrats Amy Klobuchar and Tina Smith. The state has eight congressional districts; they are represented by Brad Finstad (1st district; R), Angie Craig (2nd; DFL), Dean Phillips (3rd; DFL), Betty McCollum (4th; DFL), Ilhan Omar (5th; DFL), Tom Emmer (6th; R), Michelle Fischbach (7th; R), and Pete Stauber (8th; R).

Federal court cases are heard in the United States District Court for the District of Minnesota, in Minneapolis, St. Paul, Duluth, and Fergus Falls. Appeals are heard by the Eighth Circuit Court of Appeals in St. Louis, Missouri and St. Paul.

Tribal 

The State of Minnesota was created by the United States federal government in the traditional and cultural range of lands occupied by the Dakota and Anishinaabe peoples as well as other Native American groups. After many years of unequal treaties and forced resettlement by the state and federal government, the tribes re-organized into sovereign tribal governments. Today, the tribal governments are divided into 11 semi-autonomous reservations that negotiate with the U.S. and the state on a bilateral basis:

Four Dakota Mdewakanton communities:
 Prairie Island Indian Community
 Shakopee Mdewakanton Sioux Community
 Lower Sioux Indian Reservation
 Upper Sioux CommunityPejuhutazizi Oyate

Seven Anishinaabe reservations:
 Bois Forte Band of Chippewa
 Fond du Lac Band of Lake Superior Chippewa
 Grand Portage Band of Chippewa
 Leech Lake Band of Ojibwe
 Mille Lacs Band of Ojibwe
 White Earth Band of Ojibwe
 Red Lake Band of Chippewa

The first six of the Anishinaabe bands compose the Minnesota Chippewa Tribe, the collective federally recognized tribal government of the Bois Forte, Fond du Lac, Grand Portage, Leech Lake, Mille Lacs, and White Earth reservations.

Politics 

Minnesota is known for a politically active citizenry, and populism has been a long-standing force among the state's political parties. Minnesota has a consistently high voter turnout. In the 2008 U.S. presidential election, 78.2% of eligible Minnesotans votedthe highest percentage of any U.S. stateversus the national average of 61.2%. That figure was surpassed in 2020, when 79.96% of registered voters participated in the general election. Voters can register on election day at their polling places with evidence of residency.

Hubert Humphrey brought national attention to the state with his address at the 1948 Democratic National Convention. Minnesotans have consistently cast their Electoral College votes for Democratic presidential candidates since 1976, longer than any other state. Minnesota is the only state in the nation that did not vote for Ronald Reagan in either of his presidential campaigns. Minnesota has voted for the Democratic nominee in every presidential election since 1960, with the exception of 1972, when the state was won by Republican Richard Nixon.

Both the Democratic and Republican parties have major-party status in Minnesota, but its state-level Democratic party has a different name, officially known as the Minnesota Democratic-Farmer-Labor Party (DFL). It was formed out of a 1944 alliance of the Minnesota Democratic and Farmer-Labor parties.

The state has had active third-party movements. The Reform Party, now the Independence Party, was able to elect former mayor of Brooklyn Park and professional wrestler Jesse Ventura to the governorship in 1998. The Independence Party has received enough support to keep major-party status. The Green Party, while no longer having major-party status, has a large presence in municipal government, notably in Minneapolis and Duluth, where it competes directly with the DFL party for local offices. Major-party status in Minnesota (which grants state funding for elections) is reserved for parties whose candidates receive five percent or more of the vote in any statewide election (e.g., governor, secretary of state, U.S. president).

The state's U.S. Senate seats have generally been split since the early 1990s and in the 108th and 109th Congresses, Minnesota's congressional delegation was split, with four representatives and one senator from each party. In the 2006 mid-term election, Democrats were elected to all state offices, except governor and lieutenant governor, where Republicans Tim Pawlenty and Carol Molnau narrowly won reelection. The DFL posted double-digit gains in both houses of the legislature, elected Amy Klobuchar to the U.S. Senate, and increased the party's U.S. House caucus by one. Keith Ellison (DFL) was elected as the first African American U.S. Representative from Minnesota, as well as the first Muslim elected to Congress nationwide. In 2008, DFLer and former comedian and radio talk show host Al Franken defeated incumbent Republican Norm Coleman in the U.S. Senate race by 312 votes out of three million cast.

In the 2010 election, Republicans took control of both chambers of the Minnesota legislature for the first time in 38 years and, with Mark Dayton's election, the DFL party took the governor's office for the first time in 20 years. Two years later, the DFL regained control of both houses, and with Dayton in office, the party had same-party control of both the legislative and executive branches for the first time since 1990. Two years later, the Republicans regained control of the Minnesota House, and in 2016, the GOP also regained control of the State Senate.

In 2018, the DFL retook control of the Minnesota House, while electing DFLer Tim Walz as Governor.

In a 2020 study, Minnesota was ranked as the 15th easiest state for citizens to vote in.

Media 

The Twin Cities area is the fifteenth largest media market in the United States, as ranked by Nielsen Media Research. The state's other top markets are Fargo–Moorhead (118th nationally), Duluth–Superior (137th), Rochester–Mason City–Austin (152nd), and Mankato (200th).

Broadcast television in Minnesota and the Upper Midwest started on April 27, 1948, when KSTP-TV began broadcasting. Hubbard Broadcasting, which owns KSTP, is now the only locally owned television company in Minnesota. Twin Cities CBS station WCCO-TV and FOX station KMSP-TV are owned-and-operated by their respective networks. There are 39 analog broadcast stations and 23 digital channels broadcast over Minnesota.

The four largest daily newspapers are the Star Tribune in Minneapolis, the Pioneer Press in Saint Paul, the Duluth News Tribune in Duluth, and the Post-Bulletin in Rochester. The Minnesota Daily is the largest student-run newspaper in the U.S. Sites offering daily news on the Web include The UpTake, MinnPost, the Twin Cities Daily Planet, business news site Finance and Commerce and Washington D.C.-based Minnesota Independent. Weeklies including City Pages and monthly publications such as Minnesota Monthly are available.

Two of the largest public radio networks, Minnesota Public Radio (MPR) and Public Radio International (PRI), are based in the state. MPR has the largest audience of any regional public radio network in the nation, broadcasting on 46 radio stations as of 2019. PRI weekly provides more than 400 hours of programming to almost 800 affiliates. The state's oldest radio station, KUOM-AM, was launched in 1922 and is among the 10-oldest radio stations in the United States. The University of Minnesota-owned station is still on the air, and since 1993 broadcasts a college rock format.

Sports, recreation and tourism 

Minnesota has an active program of organized amateur and professional sports. Tourism has become an important industry, especially in the Lake region. In the North Country, what had been an industrial area focused on mining and timber has largely been transformed into a vacation destination. Popular interest in the environment and environmentalism, added to traditional interests in hunting and fishing, has attracted a large urban audience within driving range.

Organized sports 

Minnesota has professional men's teams in all major sports.

The Minnesota Vikings have played in the National Football League since their admission as an expansion franchise in 1961. They played in Metropolitan Stadium from 1961 through 1981 and in the Hubert H. Humphrey Metrodome from 1982 until its demolition after the 2013 season for the construction of the team's new home, U.S. Bank Stadium. The Vikings' current stadium hosted Super Bowl LII in February 2018. Super Bowl XXVI was played in the Metrodome in 1992. The Vikings have advanced to the Super Bowl Super Bowl IV, Super Bowl VIII, Super Bowl IX, and Super Bowl XI, losing all four games to their AFC/AFL opponent

The Minnesota Twins have played in the Major League Baseball in the Twin Cities since 1961. The Twins began play as the original Washington Senators, a founding member of the American League in 1901, relocating to Minnesota in 1961. The Twins won the 1987 and 1991 World Series in seven-game matches where the home team was victorious in all games. The Twins also advanced to the 1965 World Series, where they lost to the Los Angeles Dodgers in seven games. The team has played at Target Field since 2010.

The Minneapolis Lakers of the National Basketball Association played in the Minneapolis Auditorium from 1947 to 1960, after which they relocated to Los Angeles. The Minnesota Timberwolves joined the NBA in 1989, and have played in Target Center since 1990.

The National Hockey League's Minnesota Wild play in St. Paul's Xcel Energy Center, and reached 300 consecutive sold-out games on January 16, 2008. Previously, the Minnesota North Stars competed in NHL from 1967 to 1993, which played in and lost the 1981 and 1991 Stanley Cup Finals.

Minnesota United FC joined Major League Soccer as an expansion team in 2017, having played in the lower-division North American Soccer League from 2010 to 2016. The team plays at Allianz Field in St. Paul. Previous professional soccer teams have included the Minnesota Kicks, which played at Metropolitan Stadium from 1976 to 1981, and the Minnesota Strikers from 1984 to 1988.

Minnesota also has minor-league professional sports teams. The Minnesota Swarm of the National Lacrosse League played at the Xcel Energy Center until the team moved to Georgia in 2015. The St. Paul Saints, who play at CHS Field in St. Paul, are the Triple-A minor league affiliate of the Minnesota Twins.

Professional women's sports include the Minnesota Lynx of the Women's National Basketball Association, winners of the 2011, 2013, 2015, and 2017 WNBA Championships, Minnesota Aurora FC of the United Soccer League W-League, the Minnesota Vixen of the Independent Women's Football League, the Minnesota Valkyrie of the Legends Football League, and the Minnesota Whitecaps of the National Women's Hockey League.

The Twin Cities campus of the University of Minnesota is a National Collegiate Athletic Association (NCAA) Division I school competing in the Big Ten Conference. Four additional schools in the state compete in NCAA Division I ice hockey: the University of Minnesota Duluth; Minnesota State University, Mankato; St. Cloud State University and Bemidji State University. There are nine NCAA Division II colleges in the Northern Sun Intercollegiate Conference, and twenty NCAA Division III colleges in the Minnesota Intercollegiate Athletic Conference and Upper Midwest Athletic Conference.

Minneapolis has hosted the NCAA Men's Division I Basketball Championship in 1951, 1992, 2001, and 2019.

The Hazeltine National Golf Club has hosted the U.S. Open, U.S. Women's Open, U.S. Senior Open and PGA Championship. The course also hosted the Ryder Cup in the fall of 2016, when it became one of two courses in the U.S. to host all major golf competitions. The Ryder Cup is scheduled to return in 2028.

Interlachen Country Club has hosted the U.S. Open, U.S. Women's Open, and Solheim Cup.

Winter Olympic Games medalists from the state include twelve of the twenty members of the gold medal 1980 ice hockey team (coached by Minnesota native Herb Brooks) and the bronze medalist U.S. men's curling team in the 2006 Winter Olympics. Swimmer Tom Malchow won an Olympic gold medal in the 2000 Summer games and a silver medal in 1996.

Grandma's Marathon is run every summer along the scenic North Shore of Lake Superior, and the Twin Cities Marathon winds around lakes and the Mississippi River during the peak of the fall color season. Farther north, Eveleth is the location of the United States Hockey Hall of Fame.

Outdoor recreation 

Minnesotans participate in high levels of physical activity, and many of these activities are outdoors. The strong interest of Minnesotans in environmentalism has been attributed to the popularity of these pursuits.

In the warmer months, these activities often involve water. Weekend and longer trips to family cabins on Minnesota's numerous lakes are a way of life for many residents. Activities include water sports such as water skiing, which originated in the state, boating, canoeing, and fishing. More than 36% of Minnesotans fish, second only to Alaska.

Fishing does not cease when the lakes freeze; ice fishing has been around since the arrival of early Scandinavian immigrants. Minnesotans have learned to embrace their long, harsh winters in ice sports such as skating, hockey, curling, and broomball, and snow sports such as cross-country skiing, alpine skiing, luge, snowshoeing, and snowmobiling. Minnesota is the only U.S. state where bandy is played.

State and national forests and the 72 state parks are used year-round for hunting, camping, and hiking. There are almost  of snowmobile trails statewide. Minnesota has more miles of bike trails than any other state, and a growing network of hiking trails, including the  Superior Hiking Trail in the northeast. Many hiking and bike trails are used for cross-country skiing during the winter.

See also 

 Index of Minnesota-related articles
 Outline of Minnesota

Notes

References

External links

Culture and history 
 Minnesota Historical Society
 Minnesota Place Names
 Minnesota Reflections 
 Minnesota State Guide from the Library of Congress

General

Government 
 
 Indian Affairs Council, State of Minnesota
 Prairie Island Indian Community
 Shakopee Mdewakanton Sioux Community
 Lower Sioux Indian Community
 The Upper Sioux Community Pejuhutazizi Oyate
 Minnesota Chippewa Tribe
 Bois Forte Band of Chippewa
 Fond du Lac Band of Lake Superior Chippewa
 Grand Portage Band of Lake Superior Chippewa
 Leech Lake Band of Ojibwe
 Mille Lacs Band of Ojibwe
 White Earth Indian Reservation Tribal Council
 Red Lake Band of Chippewa Indians

Maps and demographics 
 Minnesota State Demographic Center
 State Facts from USDA
 Minnesota State Highway Map
 Minnesota at OpenStreetMap

Tourism and recreation 
 Explore Minnesota
 Minnesota Department of Natural Resources
 

 
States and territories established in 1858
States of the United States
Dakota toponyms
Midwestern United States
1858 establishments in the United States
Contiguous United States